History of the Baltic States may refer to:

History of Lithuania
History of Latvia
History of Estonia